William Napper or Naper may refer to:
 William Napper (English cricketer) (1816–1897)
 William Napper (Irish cricketer) (1880–1967)
 William Naper (died 1683), Fellow of the Royal Society
 William Napper (MP for Trim) (1661–1708), Irish politician
 William Napper (MP for Athboy) (c. 1716–after 1760), Irish politician

See also
 William Napier (disambiguation)